Bobrek (German: Bobrek) is a district of the city of Bytom in the Silesian Voivodeship, Poland. The district borders Szombierki (a district of Bytom) to its east, Karb (another district of Bytom) to its north, Ruda Śląska to its south and Zabrze to its east. As of 2011 it has a population of roughly 5 thousand people.

Bobrek is very closely associated with Karb.

During World War II, the Germans operated three forced labour camps in Bobrek, including a camp solely for Jews and the E209 subcamp of the Stalag VIII-B/344 prisoner of war camp.

Sport

Football
The first football club established in Bobrek was RKS Górnik Bobrek (founded in 1945). In 1958 the club Bobrek Karb Bytom was established, which became defunct by 2007. Currently the clubs Polonia Bytom and Nadzieja Bytom enjoy great amount of support in the district.

Notable people
 Jerzy Gołkowski (born in the 18th century), Moravian Missionary who worked in Labrador

References

External links

Bytom
Neighbourhoods in Silesian Voivodeship